Ludovico Corsini (born 3 May 1993 in Milan, Italy) is an Italian-Mozambican swimmer specializing in Sprint breaststroke. In 2018, he competed at the XXI Commonwealth Games in Gold Coast in the men's 50 and 100 breaststroke.

References 

1993 births
Living people
Swimmers from Milan
Italian male breaststroke swimmers
Mozambican male breaststroke swimmers
Swimmers at the 2018 Commonwealth Games
Commonwealth Games competitors for Mozambique
Italian people of Mozambican descent